Jim Gilstrap (May 11, 1942 – July 19, 2007) was an American football and Canadian football coach. He had 42-year coaching career, including two as head coach of the Ottawa Rough Riders and ten as an assistant to Mike Riley.

Career

Gilstrap began coaching in 1964 after graduating from Western Michigan University, coaching the defensive line at Southern Illinois University. From 1965 to 1966, he was the offensive line coach at Case Western. From 1967 to 1968, he was defensive line coach at Edinboro State. In 1969, he began a six-year tenure as Illinois State's offensive line coach. He then served as offensive line coach with the Kansas State Wildcats in 1977 and with the Western Michigan Broncos from 1978 to 1980.

From 1981 to 1983, Gilstrap was the head coach at Fort Hays State. He compiled a 20–11–1 record with the Tigers and ranks eighth on the wins list at FHSU. His .645 winning percentage is third best in school history among coaches to coach more than one season. His 1983 team, went 8–3, which ties for the most wins in a single season at FHSU. Gilstrap was also head wrestling coach at FHSU during the 1980–81 season.

He began coaching professionally in 1984 as a defensive coach with the Saskatchewan Roughriders of the Canadian Football League. From 1987 to 1989, he was the offensive backs and receivers coach with the Toronto Argonauts. In 1990 he was hired to coach the offensive line of the Winnipeg Blue Bombers under head coach Mike Riley. The team finished 12–6 and won the 78th Grey Cup.

He moved with Riley the following season to coach the WLAF's San Antonio Riders. In 1993 he followed Riley to the CFL's expansion San Antonio Texans. However, the team folded before the season started it when ran out of money.

In 1995 CFL season Gilstrap received his first and only professional head coaching position when he was hired by the Ottawa Rough Riders. The team finished 3–15 and missed the playoffs. He was fired the following season after a 0–2 start (and losing both preseason games). He finished the rest of the year as the Hamilton Tiger-Cats offensive line coach.

Starting in 1997 Gilstrap was OSU's offensive line coach and assistant head coach under Mike Riley. When Riley left for the San Diego Chargers. He moved to Linfield where he served as an assistant athletic director and assistant football coach during the 1999 season. In 2000, he moved to Tulsa as coach Keith Burns' offensive coordinator and running backs coach. He spent the 2002 season as offensive coordinator and quarterbacks/wide receivers coach at Southwest Mississippi Community College. In 2003, he returned to OSU, once again as Mike Riley's offensive line coach. During his second tenure he also served as running backs coach and as coordinator of support services. While at Oregon State, Gilstrap coached postseason honors recipients Yvenson Bernard, Doug Nienhuis, Adam Koets, Roy Schuening, and Aaron Koch.

Head coaching record

College

CFL

References
  
 
  

1942 births
2007 deaths
Case Western Spartans football coaches
Edinboro Fighting Scots football coaches
Fort Hays State Tigers football coaches
Hamilton Tiger-Cats coaches
Illinois State Redbirds football coaches
Kansas State Wildcats football coaches
Linfield Wildcats football coaches
Oregon State Beavers football coaches
Ottawa Rough Riders coaches
San Antonio Riders coaches
Saskatchewan Roughriders coaches
Southern Illinois Salukis football coaches
Toronto Argonauts coaches
Tulsa Golden Hurricane football coaches
Western Michigan Broncos football coaches
Western Michigan Broncos football players
Winnipeg Blue Bombers coaches
Sportspeople from South Bend, Indiana